The office of Master of the Hawks (or Master Falconer) was created on the English Restoration in 1660. During Charles II's reign, the Master's salary was £390 per annum (approximately £42,000 in 2007); in William III's reign, it was increased to £1500 (approximately £161,900 in 2007). The office was abolished on the accession of Anne in 1702 and the master, the Duke of St Albans, was granted a perpetual pension payable to his heirs. The pension was finally commuted in 1891 by the payment of a lump sum of some £18,000.

Masters of the Hawks
1660–1675: Sir Allen Apsley
1675–1702: Charles Beauclerk (Earl of Burford from 1676 and Duke of St Albans from 1684).

Deputy Masters of the Hawks
 1675–? Sir Thomas Felton, 4th Baronet and William Chiffinch

References

Bucholz, R. O. - Office-Holders in Modern Britain: Volume 11 (revised)
Purchasing Power of British Pounds from 1264 to 2007

Positions within the British Royal Household
1702 disestablishments in England